Eric Comerford (3 July 1912 – 26 July 1989) was an  Australian rules footballer who played with St Kilda in the Victorian Football League (VFL).

Notes

External links 

1912 births
1989 deaths
Australian rules footballers from Victoria (Australia)
St Kilda Football Club players
Oakleigh Football Club players
Australian rules football